The Ministry of Land and Resources (MLR) of the People's Republic of China is a dissolved ministry under the jurisdiction of the State Council of China. It was formally responsible for the regulation, management, preservation and exploitation of natural resources, such as land, mines and oceans.

On March 10, 1998, the 9th National People's Congress passed the "Reform Plan of the Ministries of the State Council". According to the plan, State Administration of National Land, State Oceanic Administration, and State Bureau of Surveying and Mapping merged to form the Ministry of Land and Resources. The State Administration of National Oceans and the State Bureau of Surveying and Mapping have remained existing as departments under the jurisdiction of the newly formed Ministry.

In March 2018, the 13th National People's Congress announced that the newly formed Ministry of Natural Resources shall replace the functions of the Ministry of Land & Resources, State Oceanic Administration and the State Bureau of Surveying and Mapping.

List of ministers

See also
Geography of China
Geology of China
Archeology of China
Geographic Information Systems in China
Ministries of China

References

Further reading 
 China Land and Resources Statistical Yearbook 2015

Land And Resources
China
China
China, Land And Resources
China, Land And Resources
1998 establishments in China
2018 disestablishments in China